Baltimore and Ohio Railroad Depot may refer to:

Baltimore and Ohio Railroad Depot (Flora, Illinois), listed on the National Register of Historic Places in Clay County, Illinois
Baltimore and Ohio Railroad Depot (Willard, Ohio), listed on the National Register of Historic Places in Huron County, Ohio
Baltimore and Ohio Railroad Depot (Huntington, West Virginia), listed on the National Register of Historic Places in Cabell County, West Virginia